The canton of Lourdes-1 is an administrative division of the Hautes-Pyrénées department, southwestern France. It was created at the French canton reorganisation which came into effect in March 2015. Its seat is in Lourdes.

It consists of the following communes:
 
Aspin-en-Lavedan
Barlest
Bartrès
Loubajac
Lourdes (partly)
Omex
Ossen
Peyrouse
Poueyferré
Saint-Pé-de-Bigorre
Ségus
Viger

References

Cantons of Hautes-Pyrénées